Roy Fisher is an Australian former rugby league footballer who played in the 1950s and 1960s. He played for Parramatta and North Sydney as a prop.

Playing career
Fisher made his first grade debut for Parramatta in 1953 after having played in Yass as a junior and being recruited by the blue and golds during the preceding off-season. Despite having a long career with Parramatta, Fisher's time at the Eels was not a successful one as the club struggled on the field for many years. This was mainly due to the club fielding a squad mostly made up of park footballers and local amateur players. Other clubs in the 1950s like Balmain, St. George, Wests, Souths, and Newtown were recruiting many top-class players from country New South Wales and increasingly from Queensland.  

Fisher collected seven wooden spoons as a player with Parramatta but stayed loyal to the club and made an NSWRFL record 170 consecutive grade appearance. This record was not beaten for almost thirty years until Illawarra hooker Michael Bolt surpassed it in 1990. Fisher’s record of most appearances for the Eels was surpassed by Billy Rayner in the 1964 season. In 1962 Fisher was a made a life member of Parramatta for his contributions to the club. In 1963, Fisher joined North Sydney and played there for three seasons before retiring at the end of 1965.

References

1932 births
Living people
Parramatta Eels players
North Sydney Bears players
Australian rugby league players
Rugby league players from Sydney
City New South Wales rugby league team players
Rugby league props